is a professional Japanese baseball player. He plays catcher for the Chunichi Dragons.

Gunji is a graduate of Sendai Ikuei High School and Keio University. 
On 17 October 2019, Gunji was selected as the 2nd draft pick for the Chunichi Dragons at the 2019 NPB Draft and on 22 November signed a provisional contract with a ¥50,000,000 sign-on bonus and a ¥9,000,000 yearly salary.

Gunji was the opposing catcher at the 2015 Koshien tournament for Sendai Ikuei where future teammate, Tokai Sagami high school ace, Shinnosuke Ogasawara was the winning pitcher.

References

External links
 Japan Baseball
 Keio University

1997 births
Living people
People from Ichihara, Chiba
Keio University alumni
Baseball people from Chiba Prefecture
Japanese baseball players
Nippon Professional Baseball catchers
Chunichi Dragons players